Higher Walton may refer to:
Higher Walton, Cheshire, England
Higher Walton, Lancashire, England